Miaoli County Constituency I includes townships along the coast of Miaoli. The district was created in 2008, when all local constituencies of the Legislative Yuan were reorganized to become single-member districts.

Current district
 Zhunan
 Houlong
 Zaoqiao
 Tongxiao
 Xihu
 Tongluo
 Sanyi
 Yuanli

Legislators

Miaoli County
Constituencies in Taiwan